MEMATT is an unmanned, remote-controlled mine clearance vehicle developed by the Turkish defence company ASFAT.

Development 
The machine's design, prototyping, and production took 14 months before it was ready for service with the Turkish Armed Forces. The MEMATT is explosion resistant, moves quickly, is considered reliable, and has a lesser risk of loss of life during operation compared to previous technology. The MEMATT achieved over a 95% success rate in mine tests conducted in Turkey and passed all required tests in Azerbaijan.

Characteristics 
It has a wireless system that allows viewing of cameras and video recordings as well as displaying vehicle information and real-time HD image quality. It also possesses attachment sensors on board that automatically detect the digging depth in order to prevent damage to the attachment.

Users 
Users of the MEMATT system:

 
 : 20 operational.  used to remove mines in Karabakh region
: 2 units.
: 2 units

References

Mine warfare countermeasures